Durga Ashtami or Maha Ashtami is one of the most auspicious days of the five days long Durga Puja Festival celebrated in the honor of mother goddess Durga. Traditionally, the festival is observed for 10 days in Hindu households but the actual puja that takes place in the 'pandals' is held over a period of 5 days (starting from Shashthi). In India, fasting is undertaken by hindu people on this holy occasion. People also get together on this day to dance 'garba' and wear colourful clothes. This day is also known for 'Asthra Puja' (Worshiping Weapons) as on this day the weapons of goddess Durga are worshiped. The day is also known as Vira Ashtami as there are seen to use arms or martial arts on this day.

Description
The eight day of Navratri or Durga Puja celebrations is known as Durgashtami, or Durga Ashtami. It is also known as Mahashtami and is one of the most auspicious day according to Hinduism. It falls on bright lunar fortnight Ashtami tithi of Aswina month according to the Hindu calendar.

It is believed in some regions, the goddess Chamunda appeared on this day from the forehead of Mother Durga and annihilated Chanda, Munda, and Rakthabija (the demons who were associates of Mahishasura). The 64 Yoginis and Ashta Shakti or matrikas (the eight ferocious form of Goddess Durga) are worshiped during the Durga Puja rituals on Mahashtami. The Ashta Shakti, also known as Eight Shaktis, are interpreted differently in different regions of India. But ultimately, all the eight goddesses are incarnations of Shakti. They are the same powerful Divine Feminine, representing different energies.

The Ashta Shakti worshiped during Durga Puja are Brahmani, Maheswari, Kaumari, Vaishnavi, Varahi, Narasinghi, Indrani and Chamunda.

Tradition

A tradition associated with Durga Ashtami originated in North India is to honor the kanyaka in the home. A group of young, unmarried girls (a group of five to seven) are invited into the home to honor them. The tradition is based on the belief that each of these young girls (kanyaka), represents the shakti (energy) of Durga on Earth. The group of girls are welcomed by washing their feet (a common ceremony in India to welcome someone), welcoming them into the home, and then the rituals are done as Alati and Puja. After the rituals the girls are fed sweets and foods and honored with small gifts.

Recent and upcoming Durga Ashtami dates are: Sunday, 6th October 2019; Friday, 23rd October 2020; Wednesday 13th October 2021; and Monday, 3rd October 2022.

References

External links
http://www.speakingtree.in/blog/masik-durga-ashtami-vrat-vidhi
http://www.indiamarks.com/when-is-durga-ashtami-in-2015/

 
Hindu holy days
Odia culture
September observances
October observances
Hindu festivals in India
Religious festivals in India